Radoryż Kościelny  is a village in the administrative district of Gmina Krzywda, within Łuków County, Lublin Voivodeship, in eastern Poland.

References

Villages in Łuków County
Lublin Voivodeship (1474–1795)
Siedlce Governorate
Lublin Governorate
Lublin Voivodeship (1919–1939)